Keshar-e Sofla (also Romanized as Keshār-e Soflá; also known as Keshār-e Pā’īn) is a village in Sulqan Rural District, Kan District, Tehran County, Tehran Province, Iran. At the 2006 census, its population was 183, in 41 families.

References 

Populated places in Tehran County